Mezerj (also Romanized as Mazerj; also known as Mazrag) is a village in Shirin Darreh Rural District, in the Central District of Quchan County, Razavi Khorasan Province, Iran. At the 2006 census, its population was 3,704, in 873 families.

References 

Populated places in Quchan County